Daniel McCarthy (22 January 1883 – 2 March 1957) was an Irish politician.

He was a member of the Irish Volunteers and took part in the 1916 Easter Rising at the South Dublin Union, where he was severely wounded. He was one of the first Sinn Féin members of Dublin Corporation. He was interned by the British government in September 1918 and sent to Durham Prison, from where he escaped.

McCarthy was first elected unopposed to Dáil Éireann as a Sinn Féin Teachta Dála (TD) at the 1921 elections for the Dublin South constituency. He subsequently went on to support the Anglo-Irish Treaty, becoming a member of Cumann na nGaedheal when the party was founded.

McCarthy joined the government of W. T. Cosgrave as Parliamentary Secretary to the President (Chief Whip) in 1922, being the first person to hold that post. He served in that post until 1924. He resigned from the Dáil on 30 October 1924 and subsequently retired from politics.

He was President of the Gaelic Athletic Association from 1921 to 1924. He was also a member of Conradh na Gaeilge. He later served as deputy governor of Kilmainham Gaol.

References

External links
 
 

 

1883 births
1957 deaths
Cumann na nGaedheal TDs
Early Sinn Féin TDs
Government Chief Whip (Ireland)
Members of the 2nd Dáil
Members of the 3rd Dáil
Members of the 4th Dáil
Parliamentary Secretaries of the 4th Dáil
Parliamentary Secretaries of the 3rd Dáil
People of the Irish Civil War (Pro-Treaty side)
Presidents of the Gaelic Athletic Association